Tomasz Jaworek (born 14 February 1970) is a Polish former footballer who played as a striker.

Career

Jaworek started his career with Polish lower league side AKS Mikołów. Before the second half of 1989–90, Jaworek signed for Ruch Chorzów in the Polish top flight, where he made 62 league appearances and scored 8 goals. In 1992, he signed for German second tier club Mainz 05. In 1993, Jaworek signed for Víkingur in Iceland, becoming the first Polish player in Iceland. In 1994, he signed for German third tier team Paderborn. In 1995, he signed for Śląsk Wrocław in the Polish top flight.

Before the second half of 1996–97, Jaworek signed for Polish lower league outfit Szombierki Bytom. In 1997, he signed for Energie Cottbus in the German second tier. Before the second half of 1997–98, he signed for Polish lower league side . In 1998, Jaworek signed for FC 08 Homburg in the German third tier. Before the second half of 2004–05, he signed for Polish seventh tier club LKS 45 Bujaków.

References

External links
 

1. FSV Mainz 05 players
1970 births
2. Bundesliga players
Association football forwards
Concordia Knurów players
Ekstraklasa players
Expatriate footballers in Germany
Expatriate footballers in Iceland
FC 08 Homburg players
FC Carl Zeiss Jena players
FC Energie Cottbus players
Knattspyrnufélagið Víkingur players
GKS Tychy players
Gwarek Zabrze players
Living people
Polish expatriate footballers
Polish expatriate sportspeople in Germany
Polish expatriate sportspeople in Iceland
Polish footballers
Regionalliga players
Ruch Chorzów players
SC Paderborn 07 players
Śląsk Wrocław players
Szombierki Bytom players
Úrvalsdeild karla (football) players
People from Mikołów